Neath Abbey was a Cistercian monastery, located near the present-day town of Neath in South Wales, UK. It was once the largest abbey in Wales. Substantial ruins can still be seen, and are in the care of Cadw. Tudor historian John Leland called Neath Abbey "the fairest abbey of all Wales."

Neath Abbey is also the name of an area of Neath near to the abbey ruins.

History 

Neath Abbey was established in 1129 AD when Richard I de Grenville (d.post 1142), one of the Twelve Knights of Glamorgan, gave  of his estate in Glamorgan, Wales, to Savigniac monks from western Normandy. The first monks arrived in 1130. Following the assumption of the Savigniac order into the Cistercian order in 1147, Neath Abbey also became a Cistercian house. The abbey was ravaged by the Welsh uprisings of the 13th century. 
During the Dissolution of the Monasteries by King Henry VIII of England the last abbot, Lleision ap Thomas, managed to buy time through payment of a large fine in 1536, but the abbey was dissolved in 1539.

At this time, the abbey was turned into a large estate, initially granted to Richard Williams, although by 1600 it was owned by Sir John Herbert, and had a substantial Tudor mansion occupying a part of the cloisters. The mansion itself was only habitable for 100 years or so, before being abandoned as the site became a scene of industry.

Industrial use
By 1730, some of the buildings were being used for copper smelting, and the rest were abandoned. In the late 18th century, an iron foundry was opened near the abbey ruins by a company owned by the Price, Fox and Tregelles families. The ruined walls of both the Abbey and later mansion were gradually engulfed in quantities of industrial waste. The ownership of the site passed to the Rice family, Barons Dynevor, and it was in the 1920s, under Walter FitzUryan Rice, 7th Baron Dynevor that a local group of amateur archaeologists began the process of uncovering the medieval ruins.

Archaeology

The archaeology of the abbey was eventually excavated between 1924 and 1935. The Neath Antiquarian Society was the driving force in this early archaeology, in which 7,000 tons of slag and other industrial waste were removed by hand, to uncover the abbey ruins. In 1944 the ownership passed to the Ministry of Works, who undertook further stabilization of the walls. In 2014 Cadw, the successor body charged with the site's care, began a substantial project to further protect and stabilize parts of the ruins. The site is open to the public with some interpretation display boards on site.

Gatehouse
North of the abbey ruins are the remains of the gatehouse which would have controlled access into the abbey precinct. It now stands on New Road alongside the playground of Abbey Primary School. It was originally built around 1130, but the most prominent surviving features, two pointed windows that face onto the road, date from the 13th or 14th century.

Commercial use 
The area adjacent to the ruins is used by a car retailer and a number of smaller businesses and workshops.

The site has been used to film several episodes of television series Doctor Who. The Time Lord (played by Matt Smith) and his companion Amy Pond (Karen Gillan) have filmed several times at the site, which was transformed into a complete structure.

The site was also used for shots during the filming of the BBC television series Merlin, for example the castle of the ancient kings where Arthur rediscovered the round table in Series 3 episode 13

Nearest places
Neath
Bryncoch
Skewen
Caewern
Pontrhydyfen

See also
Neath (UK Parliament constituency)
Neath Abbey Castle Class steam locomotive
List of Scheduled Monuments in Neath Port Talbot

References

External links
www.EventPicture.co.uk : FREE pictures of Neath Abbey
www.geograph.co.uk : photos of Neath Abbey
Neath Abbey article from a website on Cistercian abbeys
Castle Wales website with good illustrations
Gathering the Jewels website on Welsh Cultural History - includes aerial photograph of the Abbey site
Neath Abbey Ironworks
Cistercian Way website - article on the Iron Works
West Glamorgan Archives service- records relating to Neath Abbey

Buildings and structures in Neath
Ruins in Wales
Cistercian monasteries in Wales
1129 establishments in Europe
Religious organizations established in the 1120s
Industrial archaeology
Christian monasteries established in the 12th century
Tourist attractions in Neath Port Talbot
Buildings and structures completed in 1129
Ruined abbeys and monasteries
12th-century establishments in Wales
Monasteries dissolved under the English Reformation